WZYP (104.3 FM, "104.3 'ZYP") is a Top 40 (CHR) music-formatted radio station licensed to serve Athens, Alabama, and broadcasting in the Huntsville, Alabama, area. The station is owned by Cumulus Media and formerly broadcast in HD.  The broadcast signal can be heard throughout all of northern Alabama and much of southern central Tennessee. Its studios are in Athens and its transmitter is in Madison, Alabama.

History
It was founded by the Dunnavant family of Athens, Alabama (which remains its city of license), as WJOF. Prior to its 1978 format change to Top 40/CHR, WJOF featured a mixture of beautiful music and, at night, country music.

On June 10, 1980, the call letters were switched to the current WZYP. Through most of the 1980s, WZYP was northern Alabama's top-rated station, dethroned only by WDRM when WDRM's country experienced a resurgence in popularity among young people in the late 1980s and 1990s. Nonetheless, it has remained among the Huntsville market's most-listened-to stations through the mid-2000s.

Ownership
On April 1, 2003, WZYP was sold by Athens Broadcasting Co. (William E. Dunnavant, president) to Cumulus Broadcasting Inc. as part of a four-station deal with a sale price of $22 million in cash and Cumulus common stock. The acquisition of the stations was completed in July 2003. WZYP remains co-owned with former Dunnavant stations WVNN and WUMP, in addition to WHRP and WWFF-FM. This ended a 55-year presence in the market by Athens Broadcasting, founded in 1948 by Homer Felix "Pap" Dunnavant.

References

External links
WZYP official website

ZYP
Limestone County, Alabama
Contemporary hit radio stations in the United States
Radio stations established in 1958
Cumulus Media radio stations
1958 establishments in Alabama